Kwok Yau (born 24 October 1927) was a Taiwanese former footballer. He competed in the men's tournament at the 1960 Summer Olympics.

Honours

Republic of China
Asian Games Gold medal: 1958

References

External links
 
 

1927 births
Possibly living people
Taiwanese footballers
Chinese Taipei international footballers
Olympic footballers of Taiwan
Footballers at the 1960 Summer Olympics
Place of birth missing
Association football forwards
Macau footballers
Asian Games medalists in football
Asian Games gold medalists for Chinese Taipei
Footballers at the 1958 Asian Games
Medalists at the 1958 Asian Games
1960 AFC Asian Cup players
Kitchee SC players